Jackson Creek is a  stream in the Sierra Nevada foothills and Amador County, California.

Geography
It is a tributary of Dry Creek, which is a tributary of the Mokelumne River. The creek was linked to placer gold mining during the California Gold Rush era.

The dam was constructed in 1965.

Ecology
Tree cover in much of the watershed approaches 80 percent, with dominant tree species including Interior Live Oak, Quercus wislizinii, Black Oak, Quercus kellogii, Blue Oak, Quercus douglasiiigger, Gray Pine  Pinus sabiniana, Ponderosa Pine, Pinus ponderosa, Oregon Ash, Fraxinus latifolia and California Buckeye,     Aesculus californica.

See also
Gold panning
Jackson, California
Sutter Creek

References

Mokelumne River
Rivers of the Sierra Nevada (United States)
Rivers of Amador County, California
Tributaries of the San Joaquin River
Rivers of Northern California
Rivers of the Sierra Nevada in California